Randolph Benito ("Johnny") Balentina (born August 8, 1971 in Willemstad, Curaçao) is a Dutch baseball player, who competed in three consecutive Summer Olympics for the Netherlands, starting in 1996 (Atlanta, Georgia). Twice he finished in sixth place (1996 and 2004), once in fifth place (2000).

References
  Dutch Olympic Committee

1971 births
Living people
Dutch baseball players
Dutch people of Curaçao descent
Olympic baseball players of the Netherlands
Baseball players at the 1996 Summer Olympics
Baseball players at the 2000 Summer Olympics
People from Willemstad
Baseball players at the 2004 Summer Olympics
2013 World Baseball Classic players